Traditional French musical instruments, known as instruments traditionnels in French, are musical instruments used in the traditional folk music of France. They comprise a range of string, wind, and percussion instruments.

Percussion instruments
 Gumbe — a French Guianan frame drum
 Kayamb (caïamb/kayanm) — a shaken Réunionnais idiophone
 Pahu — a French Polynesian drum
 Pate — a French Polynesian and Wallisian/Futunan log drum
 Rouleur — a Réunionnais drum
 Sunaglieri — Corsican mule bells
 Timpanu — a Corsican triangle

String instruments  
 Cetera — a cittern of 4 to 8 double strings that is of Tuscan origin and dates back to the Renaissance, is the most iconic Corsican traditional instrument. Its most prominent exponent is Roland Ferrandi (also a lutenist).
 Cythara — a lute 
 Epinette des Vosges — a traditional plucked-string instrument of the zither family from the Vosges region in eastern France
 Mandulina — a Corsican mandolin
 Mandore — a musical instrument, a small member of the lute family, teardrop shaped, with four to six courses of gut strings and pitched in the treble range.
 Tambourin à cordes — a box zither from southern France
 Ukulele — a small, guitar-like instrument from French Polynesia

Bowed
 Basse de Flandre — a simple large stringed fiddle (a musical bow) made with a long stick from French Flanders in Hauts-de-France.
 Bobre — a bowed instrument from Réunion
 Vielle à roue — a mechanical string instrument that produces sound by a hand-crank-turned, rosined wheel rubbing against the strings.

Wind instruments

Flutes
French flutes are called flûte. There are many traditional flutes.
Graïle (graile) — vertical wooden oboe from Occitania
 Pu toka — a French Polynesian conch
 Pu'akau — a French Polynesian flute
 Pūʻili — a French Polynesian bamboo flute

Reed Instruments
 Cialamedda (also cialamella/cialambella) — a Corsican reed instrument, more recently with a wooden box body
 Pirula — a Corsican reed recorder
 Vivo — a French Polynesian nose flute

Free reed mouth organs
 Binioù kozh — a Breton bagpipe
 Bodega — a Occitan bagpipe
 Boha — a bagpipe from Landes of Gascony in Nouvelle-Aquitaine
 Bombard — a contemporary conical-bore double-reed instrument from Brittany
 Bousine — a small, droneless bagpipe from Normandy 
 Cabrette — a bagpipe from Auvergne in Auvergne-Rhône-Alpes
 Caramusa — a Corsican bagpipe made of wood, leather and reed
 Chabrette — a bagpipe from Limousin in Nouvelle-Aquitaine
 Cornemuse du Centre — a bagpipe from Central France
 Loure — an ancient bagpipe from Normandy

Horns
 Pifana (also pivana) — a type of Corsican gemshorn generally made from a goat horn

Other instruments
 Boîte à musique — an automatic musical instrument in a box that produces musical notes by using a set of pins placed on a revolving cylinder or disc to pluck the tuned teeth (or lamellae) of a steel comb. 
 Orgue de barbarie (also orgue à manivelle) — a mechanical musical instrument from the Alsace region of Grand Est consisting of bellows and one or more ranks of pipes housed in a case, usually of wood, and often highly decorated.
 Orgue de danse — a mechanical organ from Paris, Île-de-France designed to be used in dance halls or ballrooms.
 Orgue de rue — an automatic mechanical pneumatic organ from Paris, Île-de-France designed to be mobile enough to play its music in the street.
 Limonaire — a pneumatic musical organ from Paris, Île-de-France covering the wind and percussive sections of an orchestra.
 Pyrophone — a musical instrument in which notes are sounded by explosions, or similar forms of rapid combustion, rapid heating, or the like, such as burners in cylindrical glass tubes, creating light and sound.
 Ralé-poussé — a Réunionnaise accordion
 Riberbula — a jaw harp used by the Corsican people
 Serinette  — a mechanical musical instrument from the Lorraine region of Grand Est 
 Urganettu — a Corsican diatonic accordion

See also
Music of France
French folk music

References

French music-related lists
Instruments
Lists of musical instruments